Thorndale is a historic plantation house and national historic district located near Oxford, Granville County, North Carolina.  It was built about 1837, and is a two-story, three bay, heavy timber frame dwelling with Georgian / Federal style design elements.

It was listed on the National Register of Historic Places in 1988.

References

Plantation houses in North Carolina
Houses on the National Register of Historic Places in North Carolina
Historic districts on the National Register of Historic Places in North Carolina
Georgian architecture in North Carolina
Federal architecture in North Carolina
Houses completed in 1837
Houses in Granville County, North Carolina
National Register of Historic Places in Granville County, North Carolina